"Revolution Baby" is the debut single by Transvision Vamp and was originally released in August 1987 when it only managed to reach #77 on the UK Singles Chart. After the band's breakthrough in 1988 with the release of "I Want Your Love", "Revolution Baby" was subsequently reissued in September of that year, this time reaching #30 in the UK and #24 in Australia. The sleeve design differed radically between the 1987 and 1988 issues as did the track listings.

Track listing
7" vinyl (1987) (TVV 1)
"Revolution Baby" – 4:00
"Vid Kid Vamp" – 2:58

12" vinyl (1987) (TVVT 1)
"Revolution Baby" (Electra-Glide Mix) – 6:02
"No It U Lover" – 3:06
"Vid Kid Vamp" – 2:58

7" vinyl (1988) (TVV 4 / TVVPR 4)
"Revolution Baby" – 4:00
"Honey Honey" (Dave Parsons) – 2:37
"Long Lonely Weekend" (Anthony Doughty) – 3:34

A limited edition poster sleeve 7" was also released (TVVPR 4).

12" vinyl (1988) (TVVT 4 / TVVTP 4)
"Revolution Baby" (Electra-Glide Mix) – 6:02
"Honey Honey" – 2:37
"Long Lonely Weekend" – 3:34

A limited edition 12" picture disc was also released (TVVTP 4).

CD single (1988) (DTVV 4)
"Revolution Baby" (Electra-Glide Mix) – 6:02
"Honey Honey" – 2:37
"Vid Kid Vamp" – 3:02 *
"Long Lonely Weekend" – 3:34

* "Vid Kid Vamp" was remixed from the original b-side version.

Charts

References

External links
 Worldwide releases

1987 songs
1987 debut singles
1988 singles
Transvision Vamp songs
MCA Records singles